In the run up to the 2026 Russian legislative election, various organisations carried out opinion polling to gauge voting intention in Russia. The results of these polls are displayed in this article. Polls were conducted only for the 225 seats elected on the party list. Another 225 deputies are elected directly in single member constituencies, where the party can obtain a completely different result.

The date range for these opinion polls are from the 2021 Russian legislative election, held on 17–19 September, until the time next election will be held.

Graphical summary

Pre-campaign

Pre-campaign polls
Opinion polls conducted prior to the campaign and the announcement of the list of participating parties. Parties with more than 5% support of the whole electorate (enough to enter State Duma while not adjusting for likely voters) are given in bold. When a specific poll does not show a data figure for a party, the party's cell corresponding to that poll is shown empty.

2023

2022

2021

References

Russia
Legislative 2026